Katalin Makray (born 5 April 1945) is a Hungarian former gymnast who competed at the 1964 and 1968 Summer Olympics.

She is the spouse of former President of Hungary Pál Schmitt and served as the First Lady of Hungary from 2010 to 2012, during her husband's presidency at the Sándor Palace.

References

1945 births
Living people
First ladies of Hungary
Hungarian female artistic gymnasts
Olympic gymnasts of Hungary
Gymnasts at the 1964 Summer Olympics
Gymnasts at the 1968 Summer Olympics
Olympic silver medalists for Hungary
Olympic medalists in gymnastics
Medalists at the 1964 Summer Olympics
Universiade medalists in gymnastics
Universiade gold medalists for Hungary
People from Vasvár
Medalists at the 1963 Summer Universiade
Medalists at the 1965 Summer Universiade